PF-05089771 is a selective, small-molecule Nav1.7 and Nav1.8 voltage-gated sodium channel blocker under development by Pfizer as a novel analgesic. As of June 2014, it has completed phase II clinical trials for wisdom tooth removal and primary erythromelalgia.

See also 
 List of investigational analgesics

References

External links 
 PF-05089771 - AdisInsight

Analgesics
Sodium channel blockers
Fluoroarenes
Chlorobenzenes
Thiadiazoles
Pyrazoles
Sulfonamides
Pfizer brands